The Guldbagge for Best Actress in a Leading Role is a Swedish film award presented annually by the Swedish Film Institute (SFI) as part of the Guldbagge Awards (Swedish: "Guldbaggen") to actresses working in the Swedish motion picture industry.

Winners and nominees 
Each Guldbagge Awards ceremony is listed chronologically below along with the winner of the Guldbagge Award for Actress in a Leading Role and the film associated with the award. Before 1991 the awards did not announce nominees, only winners. In the columns under the winner of each award are the other nominees for best actress, which are listed from 1991 and forward.

For the first nineteen ceremonies, the eligibility period spanned two calendar years. For example, the 2nd Guldbagge Awards presented on October 15, 1965, recognized films that were released between July, 1964 and June, 1965. Starting with the 20th Guldbagge Awards, held in 1985, the period of eligibility became the full previous calendar year from January 1 to December 31. The Awards presented at that ceremony were in respect of 18 months of film production owing to the changeover from the broken calendar year to the standard calendar year during 1984. Due to a mediocre film year, no awards ceremony was held in 1971.

Notes and references

See also 
 Academy Award for Best Actress
 BAFTA Award for Best Actress in a Leading Role
 Critics' Choice Movie Award for Best Actress (BFCA)
 Golden Globe Award for Best Actress – Motion Picture Drama
 Golden Globe Award for Best Actress – Motion Picture Musical or Comedy
 Screen Actors Guild Award for Outstanding Performance by a Female Actor in a Leading Role

External links 
  
  
 

Actress
Film awards for lead actress
 
Actress